(born 2 September 1980 in Osaka) is a Japanese race car driver. He raced in the 2005 GP2 Series for the BCN Competicion team, alongside the Venezuelan E. J. Viso. For 2006 he was initially teamed with the more experienced Timo Glock of Germany. In addition to his racing, he is also the vocalist for Japanese rock band doa under the name .

Racing career
Yoshimoto is the only driver in GP2 Series to have driven the bulk of his pre-GP2 career in Asia, the rest of the series mainly moving up the ranks in South America or Europe. Yoshimoto started out in 1999, competing in Japanese Formula Junior 1600. He moved for Japanese Formula Toyota in 2000, racing in Korean F1800 later in the year. A move to Japanese Formula Three for 2001 was his reward for hard work, although his stint with the Yellow Hat team resulted in only two races.

He got his first taste of a full Japanese F3 season in 2002, though, with the Now team. He achieved 1 win, 1 pole position and two other podium finishes, finishing 8th in the championship. He also finished respectively 5th in the prestigious Macau Grand Prix. He stayed with the team for 2003 finishing 10th in the championship before moving on in 2004 for the Japanese GT Series. He also drove two races of the World Series by Nissan of the same year, for the Gabord team.

On 3 and 4 November 2007, Yoshimoto took part in the Formula Asia V6 by Renault Championship at the Zhuhai International Circuit. He won round 11 ahead of James Winslow and Armaan Ebrahim but stalled on the grid for round 12 and eventually finished 5th.

He returned to GP2 for 2008, driving for the Qi-Meritus Mahara team in the GP2 Asia Series. He continued in the series for the 2008–09 season with the BCN Competición team. However, BCN was purchased and renamed as Ocean Racing Technology after the first round of the season, and Yoshimoto was replaced by Yelmer Buurman.

Racing record

Complete GP2 Series results
(key) (Races in bold indicate pole position) (Races in italics indicate fastest lap)

Complete GP2 Asia Series results
(key) (Races in bold indicate pole position) (Races in italics indicate fastest lap)

Complete Super GT results

* Season still in progress.

References

External links

1980 births
Living people
Japanese racing drivers
Formula V6 Asia drivers
GP2 Series drivers
Sportspeople from Osaka
Top Race V6 drivers
GP2 Asia Series drivers
Super GT drivers
Asian Le Mans Series drivers
Japanese male rock singers
Being Inc. artists
21st-century Japanese singers
World Touring Car Championship drivers
21st-century Japanese male singers
Team Meritus drivers
Porsche Motorsports drivers
Nürburgring 24 Hours drivers